Palner is a surname. Notable people with the surname include:

Beatrice Palner (1938–2013), Danish actress
Henning Palner (1932–2018), Danish actor

See also
Paler
Palmer (surname)